Aratiatia Power Station is a hydroelectric power station on the Waikato River, in the North Island of New Zealand. Aratiatia is owned and operated by Mercury Energy.

Aratiatia is a largely run-of-the-river station, as it generates electricity from water from the Lake Taupō control gates and to the Ōhakuri Power Station. It does, however, have a  lake behind the station for temporary storage.

The New Zealand Ministry for Culture and Heritage gives a translation of "pegged ladder" for Aratiatia.

Aratiatia Rapids

Before construction of the dam and hydro station, the Aratiatia Rapids were a prominent feature on the Waikato River; a scenic reserve from 1906.  The dam construction meant that no water flowed over the rapids.  However, several times a day, the Aratiatia dam gates of the Waikato River are opened, which restores the rapids to their normal operation. There are several public lookout points on the high rock bluffs that dominate this turbulent stretch of Aratiatia Rapids.

See also

Electricity sector in New Zealand
Hydroelectric power in New Zealand

References

Further reading

External links
Mighty River Power - Aratiatia photos
Hydro Generation - Mercury Website

Energy infrastructure completed in 1964
Run-of-the-river power stations
Hydroelectric power stations in New Zealand
Taupō District
Buildings and structures in the Taupo District